

October 2016

References 

 10
October 2016 events in the United States